The Indigenous peoples of Yukon are ethnic groups who, prior to European contact, occupied the former countries now collectively known as Yukon. While most First Nations in the Canadian territory are a part of the wider Dene Nation, there are Tlingit and Métis nations that blend into the wider spectrum of indigeneity across Canada. Traditionally hunter-gatherers, indigenous peoples and their associated nations retain close connections to the land, the rivers and the seasons of their respective countries or homelands. Their histories are recorded and passed down the generations through oral traditions. European contact and invasion brought many changes to the native cultures of Yukon including land loss and non-traditional governance and education. However, indigenous people in Yukon continue to foster their connections with the land in seasonal wage labour such as fishing and trapping. Today, indigenous groups aim to maintain and develop indigenous languages, traditional or culturally-appropriate forms of education, cultures, spiritualities and indigenous rights.

Population 
The population of indigenous people of the Yukon prior to arrival of Europeans is uncertain. The number at the beginning of the 19th century most likely lies between 7,000 and 9,000 or more. By 1830, there were approximately 4,700 indigenous people living in Yukon.

Nations 
Inhabited by six principal tribes: the Gwichʼin, the Hän, the Kaska Dena, the Tagish, the Northern and Southern Tutchone, and the Tlingit (Teslin), there are also Métis, though unrecognized politically, and Inuvialuit, who, through the Inuvialuit Settlement Region, maintain connections to certain territories of Yukon.

The Gwichʼin homeland encompasses the basins of the Peel River and the Porcupine River. Relatives of the Gwichʼin, the Hän, live at the middle reach of the Yukon River at the border with Alaska. The Northern Tutchone inhabit central Yukon in the basins of the Pelly River and Stewart River. In a basin of the Liard River in the southeast live the Kaska Dena, and, in the south, near lakes in the upper course of the Yukon River live the Tagish, who are related to the Kaska Dena. In the southwest are the Southern Tutchone and, in the river heads of the White River, is the White River First Nation, an Upper Tanana speaking peoples.

In the south, along the Teslin River, are continental Tlingit (Teslin), whose language, together with the Athabaskan languages, is included in the Na-Dene language family.

Language 

The pre-contact peoples of Yukon spoke dialects within the Athabaskan languages, which are still spoken to this day. The Athabaskan languages themselves are a subset of the Na-Dene language family. The Cree Syllabary that was developed by the Methodist missionary, James Evans, was adapted for use in the Yukon. Missionaries of many Christian denominations wrote dictionaries, grammars and religious texts in the indigenous languages, often with the assistance of translators.

Traditions 
The Indigenous peoples of the Yukon have a land based oral tradition. The people were and, in many cases, still are hunters and gatherers, skilled in following the season changes in food sources. Fishing and trapping in the valleys remain fruitful, as specific prey can be followed to higher areas.

Knowledge about many aspects of pre contact tradition such as animal behaviour, land use, subsistence, textiles, language and spirituality comes from the oral history of indigenous people and from the work of scientists such as archeologists and anthropologists.

European contact 

Contact between the indigenous peoples of the Yukon and European fur traders began in the 1840s. The Hudson's Bay Company entered the area of the Yukon around that time.

Through the 1800s, indigenous people, such as the Hän, along the Alaska-Yukon border trapped for furs to trade for European manufactured items.

The Klondike Gold Rush of 1896 was a seminal moment in post contact history of the indigenous people of the Yukon. Not only did the influx of Europeans bring new diseases, missionary movements and European consumer items but also the indigenous peoples found a role as guides, packers and chandlers for prospectors.

In 1898, the increased European population led to formalisation of governance in the formation of Yukon.

Indigenous land claims 
In a step towards Aboriginal title, the Yukon Indian Advancement Association was formed in the late 1960s. In 1970, the Yukon Native Brotherhood was founded, commencing a land claims movement. In 1973, the Together Today for Our Children Tomorrow petition was presented by Elijah Smith to the prime minister Pierre Trudeau.

In 1990, the Yukon Final Umbrella Agreement was completed.

Twenty-first century 
At the 2016 Canadian census, there were 8,195 indigenous people. Of those people who gave a response indicating that they were of one indigenous group,  6,685 were First Nations, 1,015 were Métis and 230 were Inuit. A further 160 gave multiple indigenous responses with another 105 indicating some other indigenous background. In the 2012 Youth identities, localities, and visual material Culture, K. Eglinton said only twelve percent were fluent in the language of their nation. Fourteen First Nations represented eight language groups. In 1991, an ongoing program for preservation of these languages was begun in Voices of the Talking Circle, the proceedings of the Yukon Aboriginal Language Services which emphasised that the people are the proper stewards of their languages and maintaining a critical mass of fluent speakers is essential.

First Nations

This is a list of the fourteen First Nations of indigenous people of Yukon. Indigenous and Northern Affairs Canada (INAC) lists the Aishihik and Champagne as separate First Nations in addition to the Champagne and Aishihik First Nations.

 Carcross/Tagish First Nation
 Champagne and Aishihik First Nations
 First Nation of Na-Cho Nyäk Dun
 Kluane First Nation
 Kwanlin Dün First Nation
 Liard First Nation
 Little Salmon/Carmacks First Nation
 Ross River Dena Council
 Selkirk First Nation
 Ta’an Kwäch’än Council
 Tr’ondëk Hwëch’in
 Teslin Tlingit Council
 Vuntut Gwitchin First Nation
 White River First Nation

Of these, all but Liard River First Nation, Ross River Dena Council, and White River First Nation have signed Final Agreements and are now self-governing.

In addition the Government of Yukon and INAC list the following groups as having a presence in Yukon.

 Gwich'in Tribal Council
 Tetlit Gwich’in Council
 Inuvialuit (an Inuit group whose land claims extend into Yukon)
 Acho Dene Koe First Nation
 Kaska Dena Council
 Taku River Tlingit First Nation
 Tahltan Central Council

Languages
According to Yukon Government the following indigenous languages are spoken in the territory. However, unlike the other two territories in Northern Canada, the Northwest Territories and Nunavut, there are no Canadian indigenous languages that have official status.

 Gwichʼin language
 Hän language
 Kaska language
 Northern Tutchone language
 Southern Tutchone language
 Tagish language
 Upper Tanana language
 Tlingit language

Settlements
First Nations peoples live throughout Yukon. Some places that are primarily First Nations include:

 Aishihik
 Beaver Creek
 Burwash Landing
 Carcross
 Shäwshe (Dalton Post)
 Fort Selkirk
 Haines Junction
 Mayo
 Old Crow
 Pelly Crossing
 Ross River
 Teslin
 Upper Liard
 Watson Lake

Reserves
There are 12 Indian reserves in Yukon.

Indian settlements
Places listed as Indian settlements include:

Historic sites and parks
Historic First Nations sites include Fort Reliance, Forty Mile, Klukshu, Little Salmon, Moosehide, Takhini Hot Springs.

Kluane National Park and Reserve lies in Champagne and Aishihik First Nations and Kluane First Nation lands and is managed by them and Parks Canada with advice from the Kluane National Park Management Board.

Vuntut National Park was established in 1995 as part of the Vuntut Gwitchin First Nation Final Agreement. It is located in northern Yukon and lies adjacent to Ivvavik National Park and the Arctic National Wildlife Refuge in Alaska. The park also includes part of the Old Crow Flats.

Tr'ochëk is a historical Hän fishing site. Chief Isaac, (pictured top right) of the Trʼondëk Hwëchʼin First Nation had a camp here during the Klondike Gold Rush. It is located at the confluence of the Klondike and Yukon Rivers.

Other territorial parks that reflect First Nations heritage are:

Inuvialuit
Although the Inuvialuit no longer reside in Yukon they did traditionally. Inuit and their ancestors lived on Herschel Island and the coast of the Arctic Ocean.  In 1984 they signed the Inuvialuit Final Agreement with the Government of Canada and this led to the creation of two parks.

Herschel Island, in the Beaufort Sea, was originally occupied by the Thule people, ancestors of the Inuvialuit, it is part of the Inuvialuit Settlement Region and home to Qikiqtaruk Territorial Park.

Ivvavik National Park, also an important area to First Nations, was created as part of the Inuvialuit Final Agreement. The park was established in response to oil exploration in the Beaufort and the proposed Mackenzie Valley Pipeline.

References

External links
 Band Organization of the Peel River Kitchen Manuscript at Dartmouth College Library

First Nations in Yukon